Pickleball is an indoor or outdoor racket/paddle sport where two players (singles), or four players (doubles), hit a perforated hollow plastic ball over a  net using solid-faced paddles. Opponents on either side of the net hit the ball back and forth until one side commits a rule infraction. Pickleball was invented in 1965 as a children's backyard game on Bainbridge Island, Washington, US. In 2022, pickleball was adopted as the official state sport of Washington.

The appearance of a pickleball court, and the manner of play, resembles tennis, but the court is the size of a doubles badminton court, less than a third the size of a tennis court. Court lines and rules are specific to pickleball and include two  on either side of the net known as the non-volley zones, where the ball cannot be hit with the paddle unless the ball bounces first. The official rules specify side-out scoring, where only the serving team can score a point. All serves are made with an underhand stroke. The hard plastic ball used in pickleball produces significantly less bounce than softer flexible balls, such as a tennis ball. The minimal bounce combined with the non-volley zone and underhand serve give the game dynamic pace and strategy ranging from soft dink shots that stay within the two non-volley zones to powerful drive shots and overhead smash shots. To minimize any advantage the serving or receiving side might have at the beginning of the game, the ball must bounce once on each side of the net before either team may volley the ball, which is to hit the ball in the air before it bounces.

Between 1965 and 2020, it became a popular sport in the US Pacific Northwest, and in the meantime began to grow elsewhere. In 2021, 2022 and 2023, the sport was named the fastest-growing sport in the United States by the Sports and Fitness Industry Association, with over 4.8 million players. A growing interest in the sport is attributed to several factors, including a short learning curve, appeal to a wide range of ages and fitness levels, and low startup costs. There are now thousands of pickleball tournaments throughout the United States, including the US National Championships and the U.S. Open Tournament, along with two professional tours and one professional league. Pickleball is also experiencing growth outside the United States with several other national and international competitions.

Etymology
The game was created in 1965 on Bainbridge Island, Washington, at the summer home of Joel Pritchard, who later served in the United States Congress and as Washington's lieutenant governor. Pritchard and two of his friends, Barney McCallum and Bill Bell, are credited with devising the game and establishing the rules.

According to Joan Pritchard, Joel Pritchard's wife, "The name of the game became Pickle Ball after I said it reminded me of the pickle boat in crew where oarsmen were chosen from the leftovers of other boats." Other sources state that the name "pickleball" was derived from the name of the Pritchard's family dog, Pickles. The Pritchards stated that the dog came along after the game had already been named, and it was the dog that was named for the game of pickleball. They said the confusion arose when a reporter interviewing the Pritchards in the early 1970s decided it would be easier for readers to relate to the dog rather than a pickle boat. USA Pickleball claims research on their part confirms that the dog Pickles was born after the game had already been named.

Jennifer Lucore and Beverly Youngren, authors of the book, History of Pickleball: More than 50 Years of Fun!, could not conclusively determine whether the game was named for the dog or the dog was named for the game. They did, however, discover a third possibility. Bill Bell had claimed he named the game because he enjoyed hitting the ball in a way that would put his opponent in a pickle.

Shortly after the game was invented, some founders and their friends brought pickleball to Hawaii, where the game became known as pukaball. Puka, meaning hole in Hawaiian, initially was used to refer to the ball since pickleballs are covered in holes, but eventually became synonymous with the game itself.

History

Invention of the game
When Pritchard and Bell returned from golf one Saturday afternoon in 1965, they found their families bored. They had attempted to set up badminton, but no one could find the shuttlecock. Pritchard and Bell challenged their kids to devise their own game. The adults and kids ended up at the badminton court and began experimenting with different balls and rackets, including table tennis paddles. The  badminton net was eventually lowered to hip level to accommodate driving the ball.

Initially, a Wiffle ball was thought to be the ideal ball, but later the Cosom Fun Ball was found to be more durable and provided a better playing experience. The table tennis paddles were quickly replaced with larger, more durable plywood paddles fabricated in a nearby shed. McCallum continued to experiment with various paddle designs in his father's Seattle basement workshop.  One paddle, he called the “M2”, or McCallum 2, became the paddle of choice for most early players of the game.

Pickle Ball, Inc.
Soon after its creation, pickleball became popular with local neighbors and relatives of the inventors. In 1968 Pritchard, along with McCallum's son David and two other friends, formed Pickle Ball, Inc. The company filed its first annual report in 1972, around the same time they trademarked the name Pickle-ball. The company manufactured wooden paddles and pickleball kits to satisfy the demand for the sport.  Interest in pickleball continued to grow, and spread from the Pacific Northwest into warmer areas as "snowbirds" brought the sport south to Arizona, California, Hawaii and Florida. In 2016 Pickle Ball, Inc. was purchased by PickleballCentral.com, which operates under the corporate name Olla, LLC.

Tournaments
A 1976 tournament held at the Southcenter Athletic Club in Tukwila, Washington is credited with being the first formal pickleball tournament. It was billed as "The World's First Pickleball Championship" by Joel Pritchard and received a mention in the July 1976 edition of Tennis magazine. The United States Amateur Pickleball Association (U.S.A.P.A.) was formed in 1984, which is when they published the first official rulebook for the sport and held the first National Doubles Championships in Tacoma, Washington. By 1990 the sport was being played in all 50 states. In 2001 pickleball was included as a demonstration sport in the Arizona Senior Olympics (ASO) with 100 participants. The pickleball tournament was held at the Happy Trails RV Resort in Surprise, Arizona and, within five years, included 275 participants. The inclusion of pickleball in the ASO was seen as a significant contributor to the growth of tournaments in the United States.

The U.S. Pickleball National Championships are held near Palm Springs, California and co-hosted by Larry Ellison, co-founder and CEO of Oracle and owner of the Indian Wells Tennis Garden, where they have been played since 2018. They had been previously played in Arizona, from 2009 to 2017. The tournament has the oversight of the U.S.A Pickleball Association; itself reincorporated with an updated rule book in 2005 after its foundation in 1984. The U.S. Open Pickleball Championships are played in another hub of pickleball, Naples, Florida, and started in 2016. Estimates for active players grew to 3.3 million in 2019 up 10% from 2016. As of 2021, there were 58 member countries overseen by the International Federation of Pickleball.  there are over 8000 pickleball locations in the United States.

Official recognition 
State Senator John Lovick proposed a bill making pickleball the official sport of Washington state in 2021. Pickleball was then named the official state sport of Washington in 2022 by the state legislature. On March 28, 2022, the legislation was signed by Governor Jay Inslee on the original Pritchard family court where the sport was invented.

Growth of the sport

Since its inception, the number of people playing pickleball has grown each year, and after 2010 pickleball started being mentioned as one of the fastest-growing sports in the United States. Starting in 2019, the COVID-19 pandemic is thought to have boosted the sport's growth as people sought alternatives to indoor activities.Are booming racquet sports helping or threatening tennis? In 2021 and 2022 the Sports and Fitness Industry Association (SFIA) officially reported that pickleball had become the fastest growing sport in the United States two years in a row. Over those years the number of players increased almost 40% to 4.8 million players. Some estimates predict there could be as many as 40 million players by the decade's end.

NBA player LeBron James, retired NFL quarterback Drew Brees, and entrepreneur Gary Vaynerchuk have all made investments in professional pickleball teams, spreading exposure of the sport.

The growth of pickleball has been attributed to several factors, including;
A new player can start enjoying the sport at the first introduction
People of varying ages and physical abilities can enjoy the game together
The sport is relatively inexpensive to start playing if a public court is available
A strong social aspect has developed within the sport
Experience in other racket sports can easily transfer to pickleball
Competitive players find the strategic aspects of the sport an exciting challenge
In addition, installing new outdoor courts is relatively inexpensive compared to other racket sports. A single tennis court requires over three times as much space and construction material as a pickleball court. Unused tennis courts can easily be converted to multiple pickleball courts or be marked for dual use. These cost factors are desirable to local Parks and Recreation departments.

Court and equipment

Court
A line seven feet from the net is the non-volley line. Twenty-two feet from the net, the baseline marks the outer boundary of the playing area. The area bounded by the non-volley line, the sidelines, and the net, including the lines, is known as the non-volley zone or "kitchen". The area between the non-volley line and the baseline is the service court. A center line divides the service court into left and right sides. Regulated tournaments and games are usually played on a specialized polyurethane sport surface; however, courts are often set up on concrete, Astroturf, and indoor basketball courts.

Net
The net posts should be  from the inside of one post to the inside of the other post.

Ball
A Wiffle ball was the original ball used when the game was invented. USA Pickleball (USAP) and the International Federation of Pickleball (IFP) have since adopted specific ball standards unique to pickleball. Balls must be made of a durable molded material with a smooth surface and must have between 26 and 40 evenly spaced circular holes. Tournaments sanctioned by the USAP and IFP must choose from a list of preapproved balls found on the USAP and IFP websites.

Balls with smaller holes are generally used for outdoor play to minimize the effects of wind, but any sanctioned ball can be used for either indoor or outdoor play.

Paddle
For sanctioned games, USAP and IFP paddle size standards say the combined length and width of the paddle shall not exceed ; the length cannot exceed . There are no requirements regarding thickness or weight. The paddle must be made of a noncompressible material, and the surface of the paddle must be smooth with no texturing. Paddles used in sanctioned tournaments must be on the list of preapproved paddles found on the USAP and IFP websites.

Order of play

Any equitable method for determining which team or player will serve first and which side of the net each team or player will be on is acceptable.

Announcing the score and serving
The score is announced before each serve by the official overseeing the match. If a match is not officiated, the server announces the score.

Doubles: The score has three parts; the serving team’s score, the receiving team’s score, and the server number, a "1" or "2" that indicates whether the server is the serving team′s first or second server. The first server of the game is always considered the serving team's second server and may call the server number "start" or "2". The starting score in doubles is announced as "zero zero two".

Singles: The score only has two parts; the serving player's score and the receiving player′s score. The starting score in singles is always announced as "zero zero".

The first starting server of the game initiates the first serve of the game from their team's right service court, also called the even service court. Serves are always served to the diagonal crosscourt of their opponent. The diagonal crosscourt of one team's right service court is also the other team's right service court. The converse is true for the left, or odd, service court.

Two-bounce rule
A serve must land in the diagonal service court on the opponent's side of the net (see "service in" diagram). The serve receiver must allow the ball to bounce once before returning the ball to the server′s side of the net. Once the receiver has returned the ball over the net, the serving side must also allow the ball to bounce once before returning the ball to the non-serving side. This is known as the two-bounce rule.

After the first two returns, either side may volley the ball—that is, return it before it bounces. The ball can never bounce more than once before it is returned. No player may volley the ball while standing in the non-volley zone or touching any of the lines around the non-volley zone.

Remainder of play

A server continues to serve, alternating between the right and left service courts until their team commits a fault.

Doubles: At the beginning of a doubles game, the side serving first is only allowed one fault before their side is "out", called a side–out, and the serve passes to their opponent. After the first side–out of the game, each team is allowed two faults before a side-out is called, allowing each of the players on a doubles team to serve before the serve passes to the other team. A team's second server must continue alternating between the right and left service courts from wherever their partner left off. For example, if their partner's last serve was from the right service court, the second server must start serving on the left service court. After a side–out, the first serve is always initiated from the right serving area.

Singles: A side-out is called each time the serving side commits a fault. If the serving player's score is zero or even, they must serve from the right, or even, service court; otherwise, they must serve from the left, or odd, service court. Depending on the current score, the first serve after a side-out can be from either the right or left service court.

The first side scoring 11 points, leading by at least two points, wins the game. Tournament games may be played to 11, 15 or 21 points with players rotating sides at 6, 8 or 11 total points respectively.

Manner of play

The score
Pickleball utilizes side-out scoring, meaning only the serving side may score a point. The serving team earns one point each time the non-serving team commits a fault. Neither team earns a point when the serving team commits a fault. Since the score is always called as the serving side's score followed by the receiving side's score, the two scores are reversed whenever a side-out occurs. For example, if a doubles team faults when the score is "five three two" (two indicating the second server), the other team becomes the new serving team, and the score is stated as "three five one".

The serve
When serving, the server must be behind the baseline on one side of the center line and serve the ball to the opponent's diagonal service court. Two types of serves are permitted, a volley serve or a drop serve.
Volley serve: When the server's paddle strikes a ball without the ball contacting the ground, it must be served with an underarm stroke so that contact with the ball is made below the waist in an upward arc and the highest point on the paddle head must be below the wrist. In 2022 the USAPA announced a rule change, that as of 2023 imparting spin onto the ball during its release from the hand (known as the 'spin serve') will be banned. 
Drop serve: When a ball is dropped to the ground and allowed to bounce before the server's paddle strikes it, the ball cannot be tossed or impelled by the server in any way. The ball can bounce more than once before being hit, and unlike the volley serve, there are no restrictions on how the player must hit the ball.

Player positioning
Besides the server, there are no rules dictating where each player must stand when the serve is initiated, but serve receivers usually start behind the baseline until they know where the serve will bounce. The receiver's partner usually starts near the kitchen line. The server's partner usually stays behind the baseline with the server until they know where the first service return will bounce. Some doubles partners use a strategy called stacking to ensure each partner can quickly move to the most advantageous side of the court, based on each partner's skill set, after each serve and/or service return.

Each player must remember their game starting position when serving and returning a serve. The wrong player serving, serving from the wrong side of the court, or returning a serve, are all faults.

Doubles: A team's score should always be an even number when their starting server is serving from the right service court, and an odd number when serving from the left service court. The reverse is true for a team's non-starting server.

Singles: In singles, a server's score will always be even (0, 2, 4, 6, 8, 10...) when serving from the right service court and odd (1, 3, 5, 7, 9...) when serving from the left service court.

The non-volley zone
No player may volley a ball while standing in the non-volley zone or touching any of the lines around the non-volley zone. A player may enter the non-volley zone to play a ball that has bounced and may stay there to play other balls that bounce, but the player must re-establish both feet outside the non-volley zone before playing a volley. The non-volley zone is the highlighted area and numbered lines shown in the "Service out" diagram.

The rally and fault
After the serve, a rally continues until one side commits a fault resulting in a dead ball. In non-refereed matches, players are responsible for making line calls on their side of the net. If there is any doubt about whether the ball is out or in, the call should be made in favor of the opponent.

Faults include:

 the wrong server serves the ball or serves from the wrong side of the court
 either of the server's feet steps over or touch the baseline or are outside the imaginary extensions of the centerline or sideline
 not hitting the serve into the opponent's diagonal service court
 the wrong receiver returns the ball
 volleying the ball when returning a serve
 volleying the ball when returning the first service return
 not hitting the ball beyond the net
 not hitting the ball before it bounces twice on one side of the net
 hitting the ball lands out of bounds (outside the court lines)
 stepping into the non-volley zone, or touching the non-volley line, in the act of volleying the ball
 touching the net with any part of the body, clothing, paddle, or assistance device

Professional pickleball
The popularity of pickleball has spurred the growth of investors and sponsors. As a result, two pro pickleball tours were independently formed in 2019, and a professional pickleball league was formed in 2021.

Association of Pickleball Professionals 
The Association of Pickleball Professionals (APP) was formed by Ken Herrmann, who aligned his tour with USA Pickleball (USAP), the governing body of pickleball in the United States. All games are sanctioned by USAP and must abide by USAP rules. The 2022 APP Tour includes 32 tournaments in five countries and has attracted an average of 800 players in each tournament. Total prize money is expected to be $2 million.

Professional Pickleball Association
The Professional Pickleball Association (PPA) was formed by Connor Pardoe and based in Draper, Utah. Desiring independence to shape the tour to his liking, Pardoe did not align with USAP. Initially, the PPA required all players to sign a one–year exclusivity contract, preventing PPA players from participating in any non-PPA tours. In late 2021 Thomas Dundon purchased the PPA and extended the exclusivity contracts to 3 years. Pardoe remained CEO of the PPA Tour. The 2022 PPA Tour is expected to include 20 tournaments with total prize money of $2.5 million.

Major League Pickleball
The Major League Pickleball (MLP) organization was formed in 2021 by Steve Kuhn in Dripping Springs, Texas.  In its first year, the League consisted of 8 teams and included both APP and PPA players. The second year expanded to 12 teams, but the PPA no longer allowed their players to participate in the League. Each team consists of two men and two women. Team members are chosen by a dual snake draft designed to make teams as competitive as possible. Three separate competitions are scheduled for 2022, and the winning team at each competition will win  $25,000 for each team member. The winning team is also awarded the Pritchard Cup. The league will expand to 16 teams in 2023, with NFL quarterbacks Tom Brady and Patrick Mahomes, tennis player Naomi Osaka, and NBA players LeBron James, Kevin Durant, Draymond Green, and Kevin Love buying expansion teams.

Pickleball world records
The only documented Pickleball endurance record was in 2011 & 2012 by Justin Lawrence & Jeffrey Baker of New Port Richey, Florida. It was performed at the New Port Richey Recreation & Aquatic Center, In Pasco County, Florida. Both were employees of the rec center and wanted to find a way to grow the sport locally. Lawrence is a multi-sport athlete who was focusing on endurance and OCR events at the time, with no real racquet sport experience. Baker is also a multi-sport athlete with some ping-pong and tennis experience. Both years the duo played for over 24-hours consecutively. Due to paperwork & processing errors, Guinness World Records did not recognize the record, so World Record Academy stepped in and verified the record along with Pasco County giving them an official resolution.

United States status 
As of 2022 there were an estimated 4.8 million pickle ball players in the United States, a 14.8% increase over the previous year, with 10,724 playing locations registered with USA Pickleball.

International status 
Pickleball is not an Olympic sporting event and is not yet represented in the Global Association of International Sports Federations (GAISF). There are two pickleball federations with multiple national members, the International Federation of Pickleball (IFP) and the World Pickleball Federation (WPF). Both the IFP and WPF are pursuing efforts to have pickleball featured as an Olympic sport, possibly as a demonstration sport. The IFP is specifically working towards the Paris 2024 or Los Angeles 2028 summer games. An article by Sports Illustrated concluded the game would not likely be seen at the Olympics before 2032.

Pickleball was accepted as a demonstration sport at the July 2022 Maccabiah Games, considered the third largest sporting event in the world. This marked the first time pickleball appeared at an event sanctioned by the International Olympic Committee.

International Federation of Pickleball

The IFP was established in 2010 by the USA Pickleball Association to serve as the World Governing Body of pickleball. The IFP had 63 national members . The IFP had 70 member nations at the end of March 2022, but a conflict in the organization resulted in 7 of 8 full member nations, and 2 associate member nations, withdrawing, including USA Pickleball.

The annual Bainbridge Cup, named for the island where pickleball was invented, was established by the IFP in 2017. It became the sport's first intercontinental team event. The inaugural event was held in Madrid, Spain and pitted North America against Europe. The winning team earns the Bainbridge Cup trophy. Both the 2020 and 2021 Bainbridge Cup team competitions were canceled due to the COVID-19 pandemic.

World Pickleball Federation
The WPF was established in 2018 and had 37 member nations . Part of the WPF's stated mission is to "govern the infrastructure of pickleball". The WPF declared October 10 of each year World Pickleball Day and set the goal of introducing 10,000 new players to the game of pickleball every October 10.

The World Pickleball Games were first announced by the WPF in 2021 and are intended to serve as a format for possible future Olympic games. The inaugural World Pickleball Games had been scheduled for May 2022 in Austin, Texas, but due to on-going impacts of the COVID-19 pandemic the games were postponed until 2023.

Rule variations
As the game is relatively new, rule modifications are being made frequently. In 2021 a rule change was made for a "net serve" so that a serve that touches the top of the net and lands in the proper service court is no longer replayed.  The previous rule on a "let serve" was borrowed from tennis, where a "let" call is always replayed.

Para pickleball
Para pickleball, sometimes called adaptive pickleball or wheelchair pickleball, was officially recognized as a competitive branch of pickleball by USA Pickleball in 2016. Rules for those in wheelchairs are similar to the standard rules with minor modifications. A player's wheelchair is considered part of the player's body, and all rules that apply to the body also apply to the player's wheelchair. A pickleball player in a wheelchair is allowed two bounces instead of one. When a player in a wheelchair is serving the ball, they must be in a stationary position. They are then allowed one push before striking the ball for service. When the player strikes the ball, the wheels of the wheelchair must not touch any baseline, sideline, center line, or extended center or sideline. When a game involves both wheelchair and standing players, each player must abide by their respective rules. Standing players will adhere to the standing pickleball rules, and the wheelchair players will adhere to the wheelchair pickleball rules.

Professional tour rules
APP Tour games are sanctioned by USA Pickleball and follow all rules established by USA Pickleball. The PPA Tour is not sanctioned and has chosen not to adopt some recent rule changes for professional and senior professional matches. Non-professional PPA Tour matches will continue to follow all rules in the USAP rulebook. The specific rules that the PPA deviates from for professional matches are: the drop serve, the paddle swipe or chainsaw serve, and let serves.

The PPA has not instituted the drop serve and does not permit them in professional PPA matches. New USAP rules allow a player to touch the ball with only the hand releasing the ball, thereby making the chainsaw serve illegal in APP games. The PPA continues to permit the chainsaw serve in professional PPA matches. Let serves that hit the net but land in the correct service area are considered valid serves by USAP rules, but such serves must be replayed in PPA professional matches. If a second let serve occurs when the serve is replayed, it is a fault for PPA servers.

Noise controversy

When the hard pickleball paddle strikes the hard ball, it produces a sharp popping sound. The constant sound during play has generated conflict between pickleball court owners and nearby property owners. The noise, combined with the rapid rise in pickleball's popularity, has produced an intense backlash against the sport in communities across the United States.

In September 2020, one park in the Portland metropolitan area had to institute a ban on pickleball, despite having just installed new pickleball courts five months earlier. Residents nearest to the pickleball courts said they could not hold conversations inside their homes due to the noise from the pickleball courts. Despite the ban, people still used the pickleball courts the following year. In June 2021, at a West Linn City Council meeting, one resident said the noise resulted in family gatherings being "... wrought with discord and physically debilitating stress." Some described the noise as "trauma-inducing".

See also

Glossary of pickleball terms
List of pickleball organizations
List of racket sports
List of U.S. state sports

Similar sports:
Jombola
Paddle tennis, also called Pop tennis
Padel
Pitton
Platform tennis

References

Bibliography

External links

 International Federation of Pickleball
 World Pickleball Federation
 USA Pickleball
 Pickleball courts and measurements
 Official USA Pickleball 2022 Rulebook 
 Official rules and Equipment Standards manual
 Video on the rules and history of pickleball

 
Articles containing video clips
Ball games
Bainbridge Island, Washington
Culture of the Pacific Northwest
Games and sports introduced in 1965
Racket sports
Sports in Washington (state)
Sports originating in the United States
Symbols of Washington (state)